First-seeded Thelma Long defeated Jenny Staley 6–3, 6–4 in the final to win the women's singles tennis title at the 1954 Australian Championships.

Seeds
The seeded players are listed below. Thelma Long is the champion; others show the round in which they were eliminated.

  Thelma Long (champion)
  Mary Hawton (semifinals)
  Jenny Staley (finalist)
  Beryl Penrose (second round)
  Helen Angwin (second round)
  Norma Ellis (first round)
  Fay Muller (second round)
  Dorn Fogarty (first round)
  Hazel Redick-Smith (quarterfinals)
  Julia Wipplinger (first round)

Draw

Key
 Q = Qualifier
 WC = Wild card
 LL = Lucky loser
 r = Retired

Finals

Earlier rounds

Section 1

Section 2

External links
 

1954 in women's tennis
1954
1954 in Australian tennis
1954 in Australian women's sport